Glendale is a neighborhood located in Indianapolis, Indiana, United States.

See also
Glendale Town Center
List of Indianapolis neighborhoods

References

Neighborhoods in Indianapolis